Courtney Griffin (born December 19, 1966) is a former American football defensive back. He played for the Los Angeles Rams in 1993, the Baltimore Stallions in 1995, the Toronto Argonauts and Montreal Alouettes in 1996 and for the Winnipeg Blue Bombers in 1997.

References

1966 births
Living people
American football defensive backs
Fresno State Bulldogs football players
Los Angeles Rams players
Baltimore Stallions players
Toronto Argonauts players
Montreal Alouettes players
Winnipeg Blue Bombers players